Lentisphaerota is a phylum of bacteria closely related to Chlamydiota and Verrucomicrobiota.

It includes two monotypic orders Lentisphaerales and Victivallales.  Phylum members can be aerobic or anaerobic and fall under two distinct phenotypes. These phenotypes live within bodies of sea water and were particularly hard to isolate in a pure culture. One phenotype, L. marina, consists of terrestrial gut microbiota from mammals and birds. It was found in the Sea of Japan. The other phenotype (L. araneosa) includes marine microorganisms: sequences from fish and coral microbiomes and marine sediment.

Phylogeny
The phylogeny based on the work of the All-Species Living Tree Project.

Taxonomy
The currently accepted taxonomy is based on the List of Prokaryotic names with Standing in Nomenclature (LSPN) and the National Center for Biotechnology Information (NCBI).

 Phylum Lentisphaerota Cho et al. 2021
 Class Oligosphaeria Qiu et al. 2013
 Order Oligosphaerales Qiu et al. 2013
 Family Oligosphaeraceae Qiu et al. 2013
 Genus Oligosphaera Qiu et al. 2013
 Species Oligosphaera ethanolica Qiu et al. 2013
 Class Lentisphaeria Cho et al. 2012
 Order Victivallales Cho et al. 2004
 Family Victivallaceae Derrien et al. 2012
 Genus Victivallis Zoetendal et al. 2003
 Species Victivallis vadensis Zoetendal et al. 2003
 Order Lentisphaerales Cho et al. 2004
 Family Lentisphaeraceae Cho & Hedlund 2012
 Genus Lentisphaera Cho et al. 2004 emend. Choi et al. 2013
 Species L. araneosa Cho et al. 2004
 Species L. marina Choi et al. 2013
 Species "L. profunda" ♠ 

Notes:
♠ Strain found at the National Center for Biotechnology Information (NCBI) but not listed in the List of Prokaryotic names with Standing in Nomenclature (LPSN)

See also
 List of bacterial orders

References

Further reading

 
Bacteria phyla
Marine biology
Bacteriology